The Little 'Fraid Lady is a 1920 American silent drama film directed by John G. Adolfi and starring Mae Marsh.

Cast
 Mae Marsh as Cecilia Carne 
 Tully Marshall as Giron 
 Kathleen Kirkham as Mrs. Helen Barrett 
 Charles Meredith as Saxton Graves 
 Herbert Prior as Judge Peter Carteret 
 Gretchen Hartman as Sirotta 
 George Bartholow as Bobby Barrett

References

Bibliography
 Donald W. McCaffrey & Christopher P. Jacobs. Guide to the Silent Years of American Cinema. Greenwood Publishing, 1999.

External links

1920 films
1920 drama films
Silent American drama films
Films directed by John G. Adolfi
American silent feature films
1920s English-language films
American black-and-white films
Film Booking Offices of America films
1920s American films